The List of Parkhotel Valkenburg Cycling Team riders contains riders from the UCI women's cycling team . In 2013 the team existed under the name Parkhotel Valkenburg p/b Math Salden, but was not an UCI women's team.

2015 Parkhotel Valkenburg Continental Team

As of 1 January 2015. Ages as of 1 January 2015.

2014 Parkhotel Valkenburg Continental Team

As of 1 January 2014. Ages as of 1 January 2014.

2013 Parkhotel Valkenburg p/b Math Salden (non UCI)

The team was in this year not an 2013 UCI women's team.

  Aafke Eshuis
  Ilona Hoeksma
  Inge Klep
  Claudia Koster
  Riejanne Markus
  Ashleigh Neave
  Jermaine Post
  Rozanne Slik
  Lisanne Soemanta
  Bianca van den Hoek
  Nathaly van Wesdonk
  Annelies Visser
  Hannah Welter

See also

References

Lists of cyclists by team
Parkhotel Valkenburg Cycling Team